The Ashland Independent Film Festival is held in Ashland, Oregon, United States. It has been organized by the non-profit Southern Oregon Film Society since 2001. Founded by D.W. and Steve Wood, the festival is held each spring over five days at the Varsity Theatre in downtown Ashland and the Historic Ashland Armory in the Railroad District.  The festival presents international and domestic shorts and features, including drama, comedy, documentary, and animation.

About 
Most of the independent films show on the five screens at the art-deco Varsity Theatre located in the heart of downtown Ashland. Special events and large screenings (Calvin Marshall, The River Why, Tattoo the World) are held at the Historic Ashland Armory nearby, a venue that seats 500 people. In addition to the screenings, the Ashland Independent Film Festival hosts several social-gathering and artistic events. These include an Opening-Night Gala, filmmaker Q&A sessions after screenings, filmmaker panels, art exhibits and a nightly after-LOUNGE. The local pub is a good place where filmmakers and film goers have the opportunity to mingle and interact. In 2010, approximately 6,500 people attended the film festival, collectively purchasing 16,800 tickets.

Local programs 
In addition to submissions from around the globe, the festival adopts a fee-free entrance policy for local filmmakers to urge them to submit their films and encourages Ashland residents to attend by running two free "Locals Only" programs during the festival.  The festival has also won success with their Launch Program. it is a free program open to all students in Southern Oregon. It encourages them to make their own films and submit them. Chances are they may be selected for a special showcase each year.  In 2010, a special "Made in Oregon" presentation was added to the festival's awards ceremony in acknowledgment of the record set:  25% of the films presented at the festival were shot in Oregon.

Awards offered 

 Best Feature
 Best Documentary: Feature Length
 Best Documentary: Short Subject
 Best Animated Short
 Best Short
 Best Acting Ensemble
 Family Choice
 Best Short Film: Dramatic or Documentary
 Rogue Creamery Audience Award: Best Documentary
 John C. Schweiger Audience Award: Dramatic Feature
 Best Cinematography, The Gerald Hirschfeld, ASC Award: Feature
 Rogue Award

Past special guests 
 Bruce Campbell
 Les Blank
 Ed Hardy
 Helen Hunt
 Albert Maysles
 Elvis Mitchell
 Will Vinton

Economic impact 
The 2010 festival attendees, 40% of whom came from outside of Ashland, created a $2.8 million economic impact in the community in the 2010 fiscal year.  More than 1200 attendees completed surveys from which the following information was gathered:
 86% patronized local restaurants
 62% patronized local retail shops
 25% patronized local galleries

Praise 
The festival continues to gain national attention as a high-quality regional film festival.
 Ernest Hardy of the LA Weekly said the festival is "well on its way to being one of my favorite American film festivals, period. It's the almost - perfect blend of programming, audience and location."
 Shawn Levy, of The Oregonian newspaper, said the festival "offers movie lovers that same sense of being in a magical place...Southern Oregon doesn't have anything else like it -- nor, in fact, do most places on Earth."
 Upon her visit to the festival, Academy Award winning Actress Helen Hunt that "Ashland is a paradise and the film festival is a rich, beautiful thing to be a part of."
 MovieMaker Magazine placed the Ashland Independent Film Festival on their 2009 list of "25 Festivals Worth The Entry Fee"

Achievements 
 On October 25, 2007 the Academy of Motion Picture Arts and Sciences presented the AIFF with a $20,000 grant to help bring more filmmakers, actors and subjects of documentaries to the festival.
 The festival was again awarded this grant in the amount of $17,500 in 2010 for the 2011 festival

References

External links
 Official website
 Lathrios Film Festival Database - the Lathrios listing for the Ashland Independent Film Festival including a film list and analysis for the event.
 Photos from the AIFF

Ashland, Oregon
Film festivals in Oregon
Tourist attractions in Jackson County, Oregon
2001 establishments in Oregon
Annual events in Oregon